Heufleria is a genus of fungi in the Rhytismatales order. 

The genus name of Heufleria is in honour of Ludwig Samuel Joseph David Alexander von Heufler (1817–1885), who was an Austrian baron and cryptogamist.

The genus was circumscribed by Vittore Benedetto Antonio Trevisan de Saint-Léon in Spighe Paglie on page 19 in 1853.

The relationship of this taxon to other taxa within the order is unknown (incertae sedis), and it has not yet been placed with certainty into any family.

Species
Heufleria alpina
Heufleria chlorogastrica
Heufleria confluens
Heufleria consimilis
Heufleria defossa
Heufleria diplocarpa
Heufleria isabellina
Heufleria megalostoma
Heufleria octospora
Heufleria praetervisa
Heufleria purpurascens
Heufleria sepulta
Heufleria subvariata

The GBIF only list 2 species; Heufleria alpina  and Heufleria diplocarpa

References

External links
Index Fungorum

Leotiomycetes